Butterfly pea is a common name for several plants and may refer to:

Centrosema, a genus native to the Americas
Clitoria ternatea, a species native to tropical Asia, and cultivated as an ornamental